André Bach (5 December 1943 – 19 May 2017) was a French general and historian.

References

 (en collaboration avec Jean Nicot et Guy Pedroncini) Les poilus ont la parole, Eds Complexe, 2003.
 Fusillés pour l'exemple – 1914-1915, Tallandier, 2003, .
 L'armée de Dreyfus, Tallandier, 2004, (ouvrage doublement couronné en 2005 par le prix du Maréchal Foch décerné par l'Académie Française et par le prix Edmond Fréville de l'Académie des sciences morales et politiques).
 Justice militaire 1915-1916, Éditions Vendémiaire, 2013, 594 pages, .

1943 births
2017 deaths
French generals
French military historians
21st-century French historians